Zdeněk Folprecht may refer to:

 Zdeněk Folprecht (footballer) (born 1991), Czech football right midfielder
 Zdeněk Folprecht (composer) (1900–1961), Czech composer and conductor